Felix Barry Moore (born September 26, 1966) is an American politician serving as the U.S. representative for Alabama's 2nd congressional district since 2021. The district is based in the state capital, Montgomery, and stretches into the Wiregrass. He represented the 91st district in the Alabama House of Representatives from 2010 to 2018.

Moore first ran for the U.S. Congress to represent Alabama's 2nd congressional district in 2018, challenging incumbent representative Martha Roby. He finished third in the Republican primary. After Roby's retirement in 2020, Moore launched a campaign for the open seat. He won the primary and defeated Democrat Phyllis Harvey-Hall in the general election.

Early life and education
Moore was born on September 26, 1966. He grew up on a farm in Coffee County, and attended Enterprise State Community College. He later attended Auburn University, where he received a Bachelor of Science degree in agricultural science in 1992. While attending Auburn, Moore was enlisted in the Alabama National Guard.

Early career
In 1998, Moore founded Barry Moore Industries, a waste hauling company now known as Hopper-Moore Inc.

Alabama House of Representatives
Moore was elected to the Alabama House of Representatives in 2010, defeating Democratic incumbent Terry Spicer. PACs controlled by Mike Hubbard contributed more than $150,000 to his campaign.

Two months after Moore was elected to the State House, he and his wife were awarded a contract with the Alabama Department of Environmental Management (ADEM). Total payments from ADEM from 2011 through 2013 were $64,612.

In April 2014, Moore was arrested for felony perjury and lying to authorities during a grand jury investigation into Hubbard, Moore's friend and mentor. In late 2014, Moore was acquitted of all charges.

U.S. House of Representatives

Elections

2018

In 2018, Moore challenged incumbent U.S. Representative Martha Roby in the Republican primary for AL-02, placing third behind Roby and former U.S. Representative Bobby Bright.

2020

Moore again sought the nomination in 2020. The seat was open after Roby opted not to run for a sixth term. Moore placed second in the seven-way Republican primary, the real contest in the heavily Republican district, trailing Dothan businessman Jeff Coleman. He then defeated Coleman in the runoff, which had been delayed almost three months due to the COVID-19 pandemic. In that time, Coleman's campaign faltered, and Moore eventually won. He then defeated Democratic nominee Phyllis Harvey-Hall in the general election with 65.2% of the vote.

2022 

Moore is running for reelection in 2022.

Tenure
On January 6, 2021, Moore objected to the certification of the 2020 U.S. presidential election results in Congress. On January 7, he was one of 147 Republican lawmakers who voted to overturn results in the election, immediately after the storming of the U.S. Capitol. On January 10, Moore drew criticism for two posts on his personal Twitter account, one of which echoed the false claim of "stealing an election on November 3rd." Moore also posted about the killing of Ashli Babbitt, claiming that a black officer shooting her "doesn't fit the narrative." Twitter temporarily suspended his account; in response, Moore deactivated the account, alleging censorship of conservative voices. His official government Twitter account was unaffected.

In February 2021, Moore voted against the American Rescue Plan, calling it a "blue state bailout". The same month, he co-signed Bob Good's Right To Earn A Living Act, which would make state and local governments that implement pandemic-related stay-at-home orders ineligible for funding through the Coronavirus Relief Fund.

In March 2021, during a House vote on a measure condemning the Myanmar coup d'état that overwhelmingly passed, Moore was one of 14 House Republicans to vote against it, for reasons unclear.

In June 2021, Moore was one of 21 House Republicans to vote against a resolution to give the Congressional Gold Medal to police officers who defended the U.S. Capitol on January 6.

In June 2021, Moore was one of 49 House Republicans to vote to repeal the AUMF against Iraq.

In July 2021, Moore voted against the bipartisan ALLIES Act, which would increase by 8,000 the number of special immigrant visas for allies of the U.S. military during its invasion of Afghanistan, while also reducing some application requirements that caused long application backlogs; the bill passed in the House 407–16. Later in August 2021, after the Taliban gained control of Afghanistan, Moore called the American withdrawal from Afghanistan "a painful betrayal of our Afghan allies".

In February 2023, Moore and Representatives Andrew Clyde, Lauren Boebert, and George Santos sponsored a bill to recognize the AR-15 as the U.S. "national gun".

As of January 2022, Moore had voted in line with Joe Biden's stated position 6% of the time.

Committee assignments
 Committee on Agriculture
Subcommittee on Conservation and Forestry
Subcommittee on Livestock and Foreign Agriculture
 Committee on Veterans' Affairs
Subcommittee on Disability Assistance and Memorial Affairs
Subcommittee on Economic Opportunity (Ranking Member)

Caucus memberships
Freedom Caucus

Political positions

Abortion

Moore supported the 2022 overturning of Roe v. Wade, calling it "a huge victory for the pro-life movement and the Constitution."

Electoral history

Personal life
Moore is married to Heather Hopper, and they have four children together. Moore and his wife tested positive for COVID-19 in August 2020; they later recovered. The Moore family attend Hillcrest Baptist Church in Enterprise, Alabama.

References

External links
 Representative Barry Moore official U.S. House website
 Rep. Barry Moore official U.S House twitter
 Official campaign website
 
 
 

|-

1966 births
21st-century American politicians
Auburn University alumni
Baptists from Alabama
Baptists from the United States
Candidates in the 2020 United States elections
Living people
Republican Party members of the Alabama House of Representatives
People from Enterprise, Alabama
Republican Party members of the United States House of Representatives from Alabama
Troy University alumni